Qinghai Golmud Solar Park is a photovoltaic power station located in Golmud, Qinghai Province, China. It is 20.16 megawatt-peak (MWp), and was completed in 2011 by Longyuan Power. It uses 18.63079 MW of polycrystalline silicon solar cell modules and 1.530144 MW of amorphous silicon thin film modules. The polysilicon modules are by Yingli, and the amorphous ones are from Golden Sun Solar (GS-Solar). The capacity factor is expected to be 0.189.

There are a total of 570 MW of solar parks in Golmud, among them the 20 MW Astronergy Golmud Solar Park, completed in 2011, with 500 MW more expected in 2012.

See also

 Golmud Solar Park
 Solar power in China
 List of photovoltaic power stations
 Photovoltaic power station

References

Buildings and structures in Qinghai
Photovoltaic power stations in China